Ceratophyllus wui is a species of flea in the family Ceratophyllidae. It was described by Wang and Liu in 1996.

References 

Ceratophyllidae
Insects described in 1996